(9 March 1835 – 10 September 1916) was a Danish carpenter, who became the constructural engineer and architect at the Holmen Naval Base in the second part of the 19th century. In this position, he designed a number of buildings for the use of the Royal Danish Navy in line with the accelerating technological development of the day. Today, these buildings are used by, among others, the Kunstakademiets Arkitektskole and the Rhythmic Music Conservatory.

Buildings designed 
  (1865, listed building)
  (The Naval Workshops) on Nyholm (1878–93)
  (The Coppersmithy) on Frederiksholm (1884, after the draft by Ferdinand Meldahl, listed building)
  (The Steam Boiler Smithy) on Frederiksholm (1887–88, listed building)
  (The Artillery Workshop) on the Arsenal Island (1888–94, demolished)
  (The Clothing Magazine) on Frederiksholm (1888, listed building)
  (The Jailhouse) on Nyholm (1890, listed building)
  on Frederiksholm (1890–92, listed building)
  on Frederiksholm (1893, listed building)

Gallery

See also 
 List of Danish architects

Notes

References

External links 
 

19th-century Danish architects
1835 births
1916 deaths